The 2022 Women's T20I Nordic Cup was a women's Twenty20 International (WT20I) cricket tournament that was held in Kolsva, Sweden, from 27 to 29 May 2022. The participants were the women's national sides of Denmark, Norway and the hosts Sweden, with Denmark playing their first official WT20I matches. On the penultimate day of the tournament, Sweden won the Nordic Cup, after they beat Denmark by 71 runs and Norway won their match, also against Denmark, by 34 runs.

Squads

Points Table

Fixtures

References

External links
 Series home at ESPN Cricinfo

2022 in women's cricket
Associate international cricket competitions in 2022
T20I Nordic Cup